David Edward Paynter (born 25 January 1981) is an English former cricketer who played as a top-order batsman and part-time bowler for Northamptonshire. 

He was born in Truro, Cornwall, and played for the Yorkshire academy and the Worcestershire 2nd XI before joining Northamptonshire. After five first-class matches and four List A matches in three seasons with Northants, Paynter returned to the Worcs 2nd XI, but stopped playing in 2004.

David Paynter is the great-grandson of the England and Lancashire batting legend, Eddie Paynter, famous for performances for the national Test side in the 1930s, including the 1932-1933 Bodyline series in Australia, where he scored a match-winning 83 in one match of the series after being called from the sickbed while he had a fever by his captain, Douglas Jardine.

References

External links

Profile at Cricinfo.com
Profile at CricketArchive

1981 births
Living people
Sportspeople from Truro
English cricketers
Northamptonshire cricketers
Northamptonshire Cricket Board cricketers
Yorkshire Cricket Board cricketers